Bryn Athyn-Lower Moreland Bridge is a historic stone arch bridge located between Bryn Athyn and Lower Moreland Township, Montgomery County, Pennsylvania. The bridge was built in 1828 and in 1858. The bridge crosses a branch of Pennypack Creek.

It was listed on the National Register of Historic Places in 1988.

References 

Road bridges on the National Register of Historic Places in Pennsylvania
Bridges completed in 1828
Bridges in Montgomery County, Pennsylvania
National Register of Historic Places in Montgomery County, Pennsylvania
Stone arch bridges in the United States
Bryn Athyn, Pennsylvania